The Southern Blacklist is a Brazilian death/groove metal band from Belo Horizonte. It was formed in 2014 by former Sepultura guitarist Jairo Guedz, former Eminence singer Wallace Parreiras, bass player Guilherme Henrique (Cyhad), drummer Alexandre Oliveira (Dilúvio), and guitarist Caio Ribeiro (Dilúvio). In March 2015, T.S.B. released their debut music video for the song "We Shall Rise". In 2016, they released their second video, for the song "10 Tons of Vengeance".

References

Brazilian heavy metal musical groups